Anton Gustafsson tolkar Iron Maiden (Swedish for "Anton Gustafsson Interprets Iron Maiden") is the first and only album by internet celebrity Anton Maiden. It was released in 1999. It consists entirely of MIDI covers of songs by the heavy metal band Iron Maiden, with vocals by Anton.

Track listing
"Run to the Hills"
"The Trooper"
"The Number of the Beast"
"2 Minutes to Midnight"
"Aces High"
"Die With Your Boots On"
"Hallowed Be Thy Name"
"Rime of the Ancient Mariner"
"Flight of Icarus"
"Seventh Son of a Seventh Son"
"Powerslave"

External links
Anton Maiden for Ever Website with mp3s of Gustafsson singing.

References 

1999 debut albums
Anton Maiden albums
Iron Maiden tribute albums
Nihilism Records albums